Howard L. Marklein (born October 3, 1954) is a Wisconsin politician and legislator. He is a member of the Republican Party.

Born in Madison, Wisconsin, Howard was raised on a dairy farm in rural Spring Green. Howard is married to his wife Peggy, a registered nurse, and has two children, three stepchildren and four grandchildren. Howard was elected to the Wisconsin State Assembly in 2010, representing the 51st Assembly District, and was re-elected in 2012.

On April 7, 2013 he announced that he would challenge incumbent state senator Dale Schultz in a Republican primary to be held on August 12, 2014. On November 4, 2014, Marklein was elected to the Wisconsin State Senate.

Early life and education 
Howard was born in Madison, Wisconsin and raised in Spring Green where he currently resides. He graduated from River Valley High School in 1972 and went on to earn a Bachelor of Business Administration degree in accounting at the University of Wisconsin–Whitewater in 1976.

After college, Howard worked for First Wisconsin National Bank of Milwaukee (now US Bancorp). He was recruited by Virchow, Krause, & Company, LLP (now Baker Tilly US, LLP) to work in their Dodgeville office. In 1979, he obtained his Certified Public Accountant (CPA) certification. Shortly after earning his CPA, Howard was promoted and transferred to the Whitewater and Fort Atkinson offices of Virchow, Krause, & Company, LLP. In 1984, he was promoted to Partner in the firm. Recently, his practice has been focused on forensic accounting and white collar crime investigations. He is also a Certified Fraud Examiner (CFE).

State Service 
During the 2021-2022 legislative session, Howard serves as Co-Chair of the Joint Committee on Finance, Wisconsin's powerful budget writing committee.

He also serves on the following committees
 Senate Committee on Agriculture and Tourism (Vice-Chair)
 Senate Committee on Finance (Chair)
 Joint Committee on Employment Relations
 Joint Legislative Audit Committee
 Joint Legislative Council

Electoral history

Wisconsin State Senate

Wisconsin State Assembly

References

1954 births
21st-century American politicians
Living people
Republican Party members of the Wisconsin State Assembly
People from Spring Green, Wisconsin
Politicians from Madison, Wisconsin
University of Wisconsin–Whitewater alumni
Republican Party Wisconsin state senators